Aaron Shaw (December 19, 1811 – January 7, 1887) was a U.S. Representative from Illinois.

Born near Goshen, New York, Shaw attended Montgomery Academy, New York. He studied law in Goshen. He was admitted to the bar in 1833 and commenced practice in Lawrenceville, Illinois. He served as delegate to Illinois' first Internal Improvement Convention.

Shaw was elected State's attorney by the Legislature of Illinois in 1842. He served as member of the Illinois House of Representatives in 1850.

Shaw was elected as a Democrat to the Thirty-fifth Congress (March 4, 1857 – March 3, 1859). He was not a candidate for renomination in 1858. He was again a member of the Illinois House of Representatives in 1860, and served as circuit judge of the fourth judicial district of Illinois 1863-1869.

Shaw was elected to the Forty-eighth Congress (March 4, 1883 – March 3, 1885). He was not a candidate for renomination in 1884, and subsequently resumed the practice of law. He died in Olney, Illinois, January 7, 1887. He was interred in Haven Hill Cemetery.

References

1811 births
1887 deaths
People from Lawrenceville, Illinois
Democratic Party members of the Illinois House of Representatives
Illinois lawyers
Illinois state court judges
Democratic Party members of the United States House of Representatives from Illinois
People from Goshen, New York
19th-century American politicians
19th-century American lawyers
19th-century American judges